Margaret Wilkerson Sexton is an American novelist.

Biography 
Sexton was born and raised in New Orleans, Louisiana. She studied creative writing at Dartmouth College and law at the University of California at Berkeley.

She was a recipient of the Lombard Fellowship and spent a year in the Dominican Republic working for a civil rights organization and writing.

Her debut novel A Kind of Freedom made the New York Times "100 Notable Books" list, and the Editor's Choice list in 2017. Her second novel, The Revisioners, was named one of the most anticipated books of fall 2019 by Parade magazine.

Sexton won the First Novelist Award from the Black Caucus of the American Library Association, and the Crook's Corner Book Prize for A Kind of Freedom. She was also nominated for a 2017 National Book Award by the National Book Foundation.

At the 2020 NAACP Image Awards she was the winner in the Fiction category for her 2019 novel The Revisioners.

References

External links
 Official website

Year of birth missing (living people)
Living people
UC Berkeley School of Law alumni
Dartmouth College alumni
21st-century American women writers
Novelists from Louisiana
Writers from New Orleans
American women novelists
21st-century American novelists